Gisele Jackson is a house music singer known for international club hits, "Me, Myself and I", "Make It On My Own", "Happy Feelings" and the Billboard charted #3, "Love Commandments" (1997). The song was remixed by Danny Tenaglia and by Stonebridge and also found success in Europe,  reaching # 54 in the UK Singles Chart.

She graduated from Howard University, performed in tours for a few years with Ray Charles and Donna Summer building her career from Brooklyn, New York City. Gisele appeared singing in the 1996 film The First Wives Club and has performed all over the world, including at the presidential inauguration of Bill Clinton. She has performed solo at Carnegie Hall, Madison Square Garden and Lincoln Center. Gisele lent her voice to a worldwide commercial campaign by Johnnie Walker. She moved to Spain and toured with her 90-minute Classic Soul and Disco show 'JUMP!" with Gisele Jackson throughout Europe, Scandinavia and the Middle East.

References

Howard University alumni
Musicians from Baltimore
Year of birth missing (living people)
Living people
American house musicians
Singers from Maryland